Qaedi or Qayedi may refer to:
 Qaedi, Jam, Bushehr Province
 Qaedi, Tangestan, Bushehr Province
 Qaedi, Fars